Malika is a tambon (subdistrict) of Mae Ai District, in Chiang Mai Province, Thailand. In 2020 it had a total population of 4,364 people.

History
The subdistrict was created effective August 21, 1995 by splitting off 8 administrative villages from Mae Ai.

Administration

Central administration
The tambon is subdivided into 10 administrative villages (muban).

Local administration
The area of the subdistrict is shared by 2 local governments.
the subdistrict municipality (Thesaban Tambon) Mae Ai (เทศบาลตำบลแม่อาย)
the subdistrict administrative organization (SAO) Doi Lang (องค์การบริหารส่วนตำบลดอยลาง)

References

External links
Thaitambon.com on Malika

Tambon of Chiang Mai province
Populated places in Chiang Mai province